Megachile mucorosa is a species of bee in the family Megachilidae. It was described by Theodore Dru Alison Cockerell in 1908. It is found in the Western US.

References

Mucorosa
Insects described in 1908